Tillandsia multicaulis is a species of flowering plant in the genus Tillandsia. This species is native to Central America and Mexico (from Chiapas north to Hidalgo).

Cultivars
 Tillandsia 'Wildfire'
 × Vrieslandsia 'Blazing Tropics'
 × Vrieslandsia 'Golden Touch'
 × Vrieslandsia 'Spiraling Flame'
 × Vrieslandsia 'Swamp Fire'

References

multicaulis
Flora of Central America
Flora of Mexico
Plants described in 1941